Olé is a 2006 Italian comedy film directed by Carlo Vanzina.

Cast
Massimo Boldi as Archimede Formigoni
Vincenzo Salemme as Salvatore Rondinella
Daryl Hannah as Maggie Granger
Enzo Salvi as Enzo Antonelli
Natalia Estrada as Ana Montez
Francesca Lodo as Jennifer
Brigitta Boccoli as Margherita
Armando De Razza as Diego De La Vega
Federico Zanandrea as Mongini
Niccolò Contrino as Ugo Antonelli
Ashley Burritt as Nicole Morrison

References

External links

2006 films
Films directed by Carlo Vanzina
2000s Italian-language films
2006 comedy films
Italian comedy films
2000s Italian films